Middle Island is an island in the Australian state of South Australia located in Spencer Gulf within Pondalowie Bay on the south-western coast of Yorke Peninsula. It first  obtained protected area status as a fauna conservation reserve declared under the Crown Lands Act 1929-1966 on 16 March 1967 and is currently located within the boundaries of the  Innes National Park. It is also located within a habitat protection zone of the Southern Spencer Gulf Marine Park. DEWNR lists the islands as 'no access' areas for the general public.

Fauna
A biodiversity survey was conducted on Middle Island in November 1982. Species recorded included (but are not limited to): black-faced cormorant, Caspian tern, sooty oystercatcher and the little penguin. Little penguin breeding sites were noted in a 1996 survey of South Australia's offshore islands.

See also
Royston Island
South Island (South Australia)

References 

Islands of South Australia
Spencer Gulf
Seabird colonies
Penguin colonies